Joe Sam Queen (born June 18, 1950) is a North Carolina politician and architect. He has served in both the North Carolina Senate and the North Carolina House of Representatives.

Political career
Queen represented the state's 47th Senate district, including constituents in Avery, Haywood, Madison, McDowell, Mitchell and Yancey counties. He was first elected in 2002, serving in the 2003-2004 session before being defeated in 2004 by former Yancey County commissioner Keith Presnell. Queen then defeated Presnell in 2006 and again in 2008. In 2010, he lost a bid for reelection to Ralph Hise.

He was elected to the North Carolina House in 2012, defeating Mike Clampitt, and defeated Clampitt again in 2014. He began his second term in the North Carolina House of Representatives (his 5th total term in the General Assembly) on January 14, 2015. He represented the 119th district, including constituents in Jackson, Swain and Haywood counties. He was defeated for reelection by Mike Clampitt in the 2016 general election. In the 2018 general election, Queen defeated Clampitt in a rematch to gain back his seat. In the 2020 general election, Queen lost to Clampitt.

Queen has served as the vice-chairman of the Aging Committee and was a voting member of committees on Agriculture, Transportation, Appropriations, Appropriations General Government, Judiciary II and Regulatory Reform. He was a vocal leader in the call to expand Medicaid in North Carolina and issues such as raising teacher pay. He is adamantly against fracking in North Carolina and has made strong public remarks against it.

Personal life
An architect and a sixth generation resident of Haywood County, Queen is also heavily involved in other civic and cultural activities, including producing the summer street dances on Main Street in Waynesville and serving as director of the Smoky Mountain Folk Festival for more than 30 years. He has also served as a boy scout master, a Sunday school teacher, a youth soccer coach and on various boards and committees. He attends many arts and educational events in his district, including plays and concerts. 
He is married to Dr. Kate Queen and has two children, both of whom are graduates of North Carolina State University. He has an architectural practice in Waynesville.

Electoral history

2020

2018

2016

2014

2012

2010

2008

2006

2004

2002

References

External links 
 Official campaign website

|-

|-

|-

Living people
People from Waynesville, North Carolina
Democratic Party North Carolina state senators
Democratic Party members of the North Carolina House of Representatives
1950 births
21st-century American politicians